Quiver Distribution is an American-Canadian film production and film distribution company founded in 2019 by Berry Meyerowitz and Jeff Sackman. The company is best known for releasing films The Fanatic, Running with the Devil, and Becky.

History
In May 2019, Berry Meyerowitz and Jeff Sackman founded Quiver Distribution, a distribution company focused on distributing films throughout the United States and Canada. In November 2019, Quiver formed a partnership with Redbox Entertainment to co-finance, co-produce and co-distribute films together.

In May 2020, Quiver acquired the library of Kew Media Distribution.

Filmography

2010s

2020s

References

External links
 

American companies established in 2019
Film distributors of the United States
Film distributors of Canada
Film production companies of the United States
Film production companies of Canada